Parallels Transporter is a software developed by Parallels, Inc. that makes switching from Microsoft Windows to Mac OS X easier. It copies all user documents any many application preferences from PC to Mac, as well as creating a virtual machine of the former Windows PC.

External links 
 Parallels Transporter product page at Parallels.com
 Review of Parallels Transporter (German)

MacOS-only software